Aleksey Nikolayevich Polyakov (born 28 February 1974) is a Russia-born Uzbekistani football coach and a former goalkeeper. He works as goalkeepers coach with the Under-19 squad of FC Lokomotiv Moscow.

Career
He got 18 caps for the Uzbekistan national football team between 2001 and 2005 and was 1st choice goalkeeper .

Club career stats
Last update: 29 November 2008

References

External links

 Club profile

1974 births
Living people
Uzbekistani footballers
Uzbekistani people of Russian descent
Uzbekistani expatriate footballers
Uzbekistan international footballers
2004 AFC Asian Cup players
FC Salyut Belgorod players
FC Lokomotiv Moscow players
PFC Krylia Sovetov Samara players
FC Luch Vladivostok players
Russian Premier League players
Association football goalkeepers
FC Tom Tomsk players
Expatriate footballers in Russia
Uzbekistani expatriate sportspeople in Russia
People from Shebekino
FC Neftekhimik Nizhnekamsk players
Sportspeople from Belgorod Oblast